Pleurothallopsis is a genus of orchids comprising about 18 species native to western South America and southern Central America.

Species list
Pleurothallopsis carnosa 
Pleurothallopsis clausa 
Pleurothallopsis inaequalis 
Pleurothallopsis insons 
Pleurothallopsis lehmannii 
Pleurothallopsis microptera 
Pleurothallopsis monetalis 
Pleurothallopsis mulderae 
Pleurothallopsis nemorosa 
Pleurothallopsis niesseniae 
Pleurothallopsis norae 
Pleurothallopsis pandurata 
Pleurothallopsis powersii 
Pleurothallopsis reichenbachiana 
Pleurothallopsis rinkei 
Pleurothallopsis striata 
Pleurothallopsis tubulosa 
Pleurothallopsis ujarensis

References

Pleurothallidinae
Pleurothallidinae genera